OEC may refer to:

Finance
 The Observatory of Economic Complexity, a data visualization site
 Ordre des Experts-Comptables, French association of chartered accountants

Transportation
 Orion Expedition Cruises, Australian based luxury expedition cruise line 
 Otis Elevator Company, an American company that manufactures vertical transportation systems
 Osborn Engineering Company, known as OEC, an historic British former manufacturer of motorcycles

Other
 Offshore Energy Center, sponsor of the Ocean Star Offshore Drilling Rig & Museum in Galveston, Texas, United States
 Old Earth creationism, a term for several types of creationism
 Olfactory ensheathing cells, a type of glial cell found in the nervous system
 Oregon Environmental Council, an American environmental organization
 Orissa Engineering College, a technical institution in Bhubaneswar, Orissa, India
 Outdoor Emergency Care, a course for certification of first aid in non-urban situations
 Oxford English Corpus, an English text corpus
 Oxygen evolving complex, a water oxidizing enzyme
 .OEC, the file format for OE-Cake!, a fluid physics software application